Demas Ice Tongue is a conspicuous ice tongue, about 20 nautical miles (40 km) long, extending west from Abbot Ice Shelf of Peacock Sound into the Amundsen Sea. It was discovered by members of the United States Antarctic Service in flights from the Bear, February 1940, and named after E.J. Demas (d. 1979), a member of the Byrd Antarctic Expeditions of 1928–30 and 1933–35.

References

Ice tongues of Antarctica
Bodies of ice of Marie Byrd Land